Prince Guillaume, Hereditary Grand Duke of Luxembourg (Guillaume Jean Joseph Marie; born 11 November 1981), is the heir apparent to the crown of Luxembourg since his father's accession in 2000.

Early life and education
Prince Guillaume was born on 11 November 1981 at the Grand Duchess Charlotte Maternity Hospital in Luxembourg City and is the eldest child of Grand Duke Henri of Luxembourg and his wife, Cuban-born Grand Duchess Maria Teresa. His godparents are Princess Marie Astrid of Luxembourg and Prince Guillaume of Luxembourg. Guillaume has four younger siblings: Prince Félix, Prince Louis, Princess Alexandra and Prince Sébastien.

Guillaume's education includes Lycée Robert-Schumann in Luxembourg; Swiss boarding schools the Institut Le Rosey and the Collège Alpin International Beau Soleil where he finished the French baccalaureate in 2001; and Royal Military Academy Sandhurst, Camberley, England. He began his higher education studies in the United Kingdom where he studied at University College, Durham and Brunel University, both in England. In 2006 he entered Institut Philanthropos in Fribourg, Switzerland, where he spent a year studying philosophy and anthropology. He later studied letters and political science at the Institut Albert-le-Grand in Angers, receiving his bachelor's degree with honors in 2009. His degree was issued by Université d'Angers, as a result of a partnership agreement between the two schools. From 2018 until 2019, Prince Guillaume attended a postgraduate training at the Royal College of Defence Studies (RCDS) in London.

The Hereditary Grand Duke completed internships at the Belgian Chemical Union in 2003, at the Deutsche Bank in London in 2004, and at the Spanish branch of ArcelorMittal in 2005. Sworn in December 2002 as an officer in the Luxembourg Army, Prince Guillaume holds the rank of colonel.

Hereditary Grand Duke
Guillaume has been heir apparent to the crown of Luxembourg since his father's accession in 2000. If he succeeds to the grand ducal throne, he will reign as Guillaume V (English: William V).

Guillaume became the honorary chairman of the Board of Economic Development of the Grand Duchy of Luxembourg, an agency for economic promotion and development, in March 2001. He has also been a member of the Council of State since 24 June 2005. He attended the Millennium Conference at the United Nations headquarters in New York City in 2005. Prince Guillaume also worked at the European Commission and the Permanent Representation of Luxembourg to the European Union in Brussels in 2012. 

The Hereditary Grand Duke is patron of the Luxembourg Cycling Sport Federation, Youth Hostels Central, National Association of Road Victims, Chamber Orchestra of Luxembourg, Youth Harmony Orchestra of the European Union, as well as to Young Entrepreneurs Luxembourg and Special Olympics Luxembourg Associations.

During the summer of 1997, Guillaume participated as a member of Luxembourg Scout Movement in a humanitarian camp in Nepal. He was involved in a reforestation project and other actions for the benefit of less fortunate communities. In 2017, the Hereditary Grand Duke joined the board of directors of the World Scout Foundation to support the development of scouting around the world.

In 1999, he participated in a charitable mission in Aguascalientes to provide the educational and social assistance to young people in one of the most deprived areas in Mexico. After having chaired the Kräizbierg Foundation, which works for people with disabilities, for more than 10 years (2000–2011), the Hereditary Grand Duke accepted the title of honorary president in March 2011.

Since 18 January 2016, the Hereditary Grand Duke has been a member of the board of directors of Europäische Stiftung Kaiserdom zu Speyer Foundation. He is also a member of the board of directors of the Fondation du Grand-Duc et de la Grande-Duchesse.

On 2 July 2021, Prince Guillaume, with his wife and son, inaugurated the Ettelbruck Agricultural Fair 2021. On 12 July, he and his family visited Luxembourg nursing homes to meet elderly people and ensure their well-being during COVID-19 pandemic. At each of their visits, the couple expressed their gratitude to the staff of the nursing homes for the efforts made in maintaining a warm environment around the residents, throughout the pandemic.

Marriage and fatherhood
At the occasion of his 30th birthday, he gave interviews during which stated that he was in a relationship with a "dear miss" that had been going strong for more than a year but insisted that they need some more time to evaluate their possible future. On 26 April 2012, the court announced the engagement of the Hereditary Grand Duke to the Belgian Countess Stéphanie de Lannoy. The civil wedding took place on Friday, 19 October 2012; the religious wedding took place on Saturday, 20 October 2012 at the Notre-Dame Cathedral.

Guillaume and Stéphanie have a son, named Prince Charles, born on 10 May 2020 at Grand Duchess Charlotte Maternity Hospital in Luxembourg. He is second in the line of succession to the throne of Luxembourg. In September 2022, it was announced that the couple was expecting their second child, with the birth due in April 2023.

Interests
Guillaume is interested in music and sports; he plays the piano and enjoys football, swimming and volleyball. He speaks Luxembourgish, French, German, Spanish and English. He regularly represents his parents in many foreign activities.

Titles and style

His style and title in full is: His Royal Highness Prince Guillaume Jean Joseph Marie, Hereditary Grand Duke of Luxembourg, Hereditary Prince of Nassau, Prince of Bourbon-Parma.

Honours

National

:
 Knight of the Order of the Gold Lion of the House of Nassau (11 November 1981)
 Grand Cross of Order of Adolphe of Nassau (11 November 1981)
 Grand Cross of the Order of the Oak Crown (23 June 2012)

Foreign
 :
 Grand Cross of the Order of the Crown
 :
 Grand Officer of the Order of the Legion of Honour
 :
 Knight Grand Cross of the Order of Merit of the Italian Republic
 :
 Knight Grand Cross of the Order of Orange-Nassau
 Recipient of the King Willem-Alexander Inauguration Medal
 :
 Grand Cross of the Order of Aviz (23 May 2017)
 : 
 Commander of the National Order of the Lion (24 February 2023)
 :
 Grand Officer of the Order of the White Double Cross
 :
 Recipient of the Sandhurst Medal (22 September 2020)

See also 
 Grand Duke of Luxembourg
 Grand Ducal Family of Luxembourg
 List of current heirs apparent

References

External links

The Hereditary Grand Duke – Official website of the Grand Ducal Palace

1981 births
Alumni of Institut Le Rosey
Members of the Council of State of Luxembourg
Alumni of University College, Durham
Heirs apparent
Alumni of Brunel University London
Graduates of the Royal Military Academy Sandhurst
People from Luxembourg City
House of Luxembourg-Nassau
Princes of Nassau
Princes of Bourbon-Parma
Living people
Luxembourgian people of Cuban descent
20th-century Roman Catholics
21st-century Roman Catholics
Sons of monarchs

Knights Grand Cross of the Order of Merit of the Italian Republic
Knights Grand Cross of the Order of Orange-Nassau
Grand Crosses of the Order of Aviz
Grand Croix of the Légion d'honneur
Collège Alpin International Beau Soleil alumni